Alupi Airstrip  is a rural airstrip in Groot Henar serving the rice growing region southeast of Nieuw Nickerie, in the Nickerie District of Suriname. The airstrip is next to the Nickerie River.

See also

List of airports in Suriname
Transport in Suriname

References

External links
OpenStreetMap - Alupi
Google Maps - Alupi

Airports in Suriname
Nickerie District